William Louther Armstrong (19 April 1892 – 12 March 1968) was a qualified medical practitioner and an Australian rules footballer.

Family
The son of William Louther Armstrong (1860-1936), and Catherine Armstrong (1868-1941), née Anstey, William Louther Armstrong was born at Albert Park, Victoria on 19 April 1892.

He married Nita Elizabeth Hunter (1890-1973) on 14 November 1918.

Education
He attended Wesley College.

Football
Armstrong only played one season of Victorian Football League football, in 1911 for University. He played only three games in his short career, and was an ex-Wesley College player.

Military service
He served in the First AIF.

Medical practitioner
After leaving the army he worked for many years in Shepparton as a medical practitioner.

Notes

References
 Holmesby, Russell & Main, Jim (2002), The Encyclopedia of AFL Footballers: every AFL/VFL player since 1897 (4th ed.). Melbourne: Crown Content.

External links
 
 
 William Louther Armstrong, at "Find a Grave'' 

1892 births
University Football Club players
Australian rules footballers from Melbourne
1968 deaths
People educated at Wesley College (Victoria)
Australian military personnel of World War I
People from Albert Park, Victoria
Medical doctors from Melbourne
Military personnel from Melbourne